Canadian oil sands may refer to:

 Athabasca oil sands.
 Peace River or Cold Lake where other bitumen deposits are located
 Fort McMurray where the industry is located
 Canadian Oil Sands Trust

See also
Oil sands
Bitumen
Heavy crude oil